The Franciscan Friary, Baja, is a Franciscan friary in the city of Baja in the Southern Great Plain Region of Hungary.

Baja, Franciscan friary
Buildings and structures in Bács-Kiskun County